The Sydney Monorail (originally TNT Harbourlink and later Metro Monorail) was a single-loop monorail in Sydney, Australia, that connected Darling Harbour, Chinatown and the Sydney central business and shopping districts. It opened in July 1988 and closed in June 2013.

There were eight stations on the  loop, with up to six trains operating simultaneously. It served major attractions and facilities such as the Powerhouse Museum, Sydney Aquarium and Sydney Convention & Exhibition Centre. The system was operated by Veolia Transport Sydney, a former subsidiary of Veolia Transport and a subsidiary of Veolia Transdev at the time of cessation.

History
Sydney City Council preferred a light rail line, however in November 1985 Transport Minister Laurie Brereton announced a monorail would be built. Initially operated by TNT Harbourlink, the monorail opened on 21 July 1988 after a construction period of 26 months. The first test services ran in October 1987 on a 500-metre section at Darling Harbour. TNT Harbourlink was awarded a 50-year concession until 2038.

The original operation hours were to be 06:00 to midnight, but after two years of operation patronage counts were half those expected, and planned stations at Market Street (to be named Casino, as part of the gaming venue planned to be built on the site) and Harbour Street (to be named Gardenside) were not built for some time.

Metro Transport Sydney ownership

After TNT was purchased by PTT in January 1997 and merged to form TNT Post Group in 1998, TNT decided to dispose of its businesses not centered on mail and logistics services, including the Sydney monorail. On 10 August 1998, TNT sold the monorail to CGEA Transport Sydney, which was owned by CGEA Transport (later renamed Connex, then Veolia Transport) (51%) and Australian Infrastructure Fund (19%), Utilities Trust of Australia (19%) and Legal & General (11%). The latter three also owned the Sydney Light Rail Company (SLRC), which owned the Metro Light Rail (now Sydney Light Rail) on a 30.5 year concession since 1997 by the Government of New South Wales. Connex (renamed from CGEA Transport in 1999) sold its share of the monorail in early 2001 to the SLRC, but remained as the operator of the monorail. As a result, SLRC owned both the monorail and light rail and combined with CGEA Transport to form Metro Transport Sydney. 

The monorail operator was renamed to Veolia Transport Sydney in 2005 as part of the global Veolia rebranding from Connex to Veolia Transport. In 2011, Veolia Transport globally merged with the old Transdev to form Veolia Transdev, and Veolia Transport Sydney became a subsidiary of Veolia Transdev (now Transdev).

Government takeover & cessation

The Government of New South Wales bought both the monorail and the light rail service from Metro Transport Sydney on 23 March 2012 to enable it to extend the light rail system without having to negotiate with the private owners, and to remove the monorail from the area near Haymarket required for the expanded Sydney Convention & Exhibition Centre. Veolia Transport Sydney continued to operate the light rail and monorail after the government takeover.

The monorail ceased operating on 30 June 2013 and all sections of track and some of the stations have been dismantled. Around 70 million passenger journeys were made on the line during its lifetime. Two carriages and 10 metres of track have been preserved at the Powerhouse Museum. Two carriages are being used as meeting rooms at Google's Pyrmont offices.

Ticketing and concessions

Payment for single journeys was made by tokens inserted into the turnstile. For multiple journeys, customers could purchase pre-paid cards. The first card type was based on magnetic stripe technology and called the METROCard. Shortly before the closure of the Monorail, a new contactless card was introduced called the smart.

Technology

The track was a steel box girder of 94 centimetres width, raised at a minimum height of 5.5 metres from ground level on steel columns 20 to 40 metres apart. The minimum curve radius was 20 metres and the maximum gradient 4.4% uphill and 6.5% downhill.

Power was supplied at 500 V AC to power the train, via a sheathed conductor below the running plate of the track. A control rail was also provided for train control, and a generator provided to clear trains from the track in emergencies. The train control and maintenance facility was located between Convention and Paddy's Market stations, where a traverser moved trains in and out of service.

Each station stop took 40 seconds, including the time to decelerate, board passengers, and accelerate again. A complete circuit of the route took 12 minutes. It was originally intended for the system to operate automatically, but after a number of breakdowns soon after opening, it was decided to retain drivers, who occupied the first car of each train.

Rolling stock

Delivered in 1987, six trains of seven carriages were built by Von Roll Holding to the Type III specification. Each seated 48 passengers, with the driver occupying the leading carriage. (They were designed to seat 56, using all seven carriages.) The first was displayed at the Trans Public Show in Geneva, Switzerland in May 1987.

The doors of each car were automatic, and the floor level was self-adjusting via an automatic suspension system.

Set 1 was stored following a significant collision between it and Set 4 in early 2010. The last carriage in Set 1 was removed from the set, and used to replace the damaged last carriage in Set 4. When operations ceased in June 2013, sets 2 - 6 were operational.

Stations
The monorail operated in a single anticlockwise loop with stops at the following stations (in order):

Maintenance and control facilities

The six monorail units were maintained in a purpose-built facility in Pyrmont. A traverser allowed monorail cars to be removed from the main track for maintenance or stabling. Maintenance of track and stations was conducted at night with two special vehicles, named 'Buggy' and 'Mule'.

The facility also housed the control room (located above the maintenance area), as well as administration and staff amenities.

Criticism
The decision to build the monorail over other forms of rail such as light rail was in the eyes of many a political decision. Light rail would have been $20 million cheaper to build, serviced more passengers per hour and cost 40% less for a ticket, but the monorail system prevailed. The city of Sydney formerly had a tram system that was in operation from 1861 until 1961.

Incidents
On Thursday 28 July 1988, an electrical fault caused the system to cease operating. Fifty passengers were stranded in carriages for two hours between 3:50 - 5:50 pm. TNT Harbourlink was criticised for failing to call emergency services until 5:40 - by the time the fire brigade arrived at the scene, the passengers were en route to disembarking at a station.   

In July 1992, monorail services were suspended due to a fire in a wool store building which caused a wall to collapse 'within metres' of TNT Harbourlink's central control room offices. 

On 27 February 2010, at approximately 16:00, two monorail trains collided at the Darling Park station resulting in hospitalisation of four people.

On 24 September 2012, just before 14:00, an Ausgrid failure in a local underground cable led to a complete shutdown of the system resulting in the need for cherry-pickers to come to rescue approximately 100 stranded passengers, a process which took several hours. It was the first time since 2000 that Fire and Rescue NSW had to be called to help people from the line.

Removal
Regarding the removal, Transport for New South Wales released a document called "Monorail Removal Project Interpretation Strategy" in July 2013. In Volume I part 3.5 "Decommissioning the monorail", three quotes from 'Government Buys Light Rail Company: Monorail To Be Pulled Down', the media release by Premier Barry O'Farrell on 23 March 2012 are provided.

Deputy Mayor of Hobart, Alderman, Ron Christie unsuccessfully asked the NSW government to donate the monorail to Hobart to allow it to be used on a route from the CBD to the northern suburbs. Google purchased two carriages for use as meeting rooms at its Pyrmont office.

The monorail was demolished in 2013. Sixty steel beams were recycled to build a temporary bridge to take Brookhollow Avenue over Norwest station during its construction between 2014 and 2017. The temporary bridge allowed the station to be dug underneath Brookhollow Avenue, allowing the road to be closed for only a few months instead of three years as originally proposed. The bridge was dismantled in 2017 as the final station structure was being built.

In January 2015, 22 carriages were put up for sale on Gumtree Australia at $3,000 per carriage.  Many of these carriages were subsequently sold to an Australian expatriate now living in Taiwan. One was sold to a pair of radio hosts. Four, which comprise the only set of carriages preserved with all running gear that includes both a front and a rear carriage as well as middle carriages, other than the full train preserved by the Sydney Electric Train Society, were sold to a Sydney resident who plans to restore them to running condition.

Preservation
Eleven carriages from three of the six monorail trains have been preserved and two carriages converted.

In popular culture
The Monorail system was used for scenes in The Saint: Fear in Fun Park and Mighty Morphin Power Rangers: The Movie, where one train set had "Angel Grove" painted on it. It was also briefly featured in the 1996 Australian film Napoleon and the 1999 Australian cult film Two Hands.

The monorail is featured in the songs "Riding My Train" from the Muppets video Muppets on Wheels and  Jaane Kyon from the 2001 Bollywood movie Dil Chahta Hai.

Clive James, in his 1991 Postcard from Sydney television special said, "Feted to break even the day hell freezes over, the monorail runs from the middle of downtown Sydney, to the middle of downtown Sydney, after circumnavigating the middle of downtown Sydney".

See also
List of rapid transit systems
List of monorail systems

References

External links

Sydney Monorail website (March 2012)
Harbourlink - Remember Sydney Monorail Web Site
Monorail Society page on the monorail
  [CC-By-SA]

Defunct monorails
Closed railway lines in Sydney
Monorails in Australia
People mover systems in Australia
Railway lines opened in 1988
Railway lines closed in 2013
Transport in Sydney
Urban people mover systems
Von Roll Holding people movers
1988 establishments in Australia
2013 disestablishments in Australia